Michel Berson  (21 April 1945 – 8 April 2021) was a French politician.

Berson was a member of the Senate (2011–2017), a Deputy (1981–1997) and mayor of Crosne (1977–1998).

He was a knight of the Legion of Honour.

References

1945 births
2021 deaths
French politicians
Socialist Party (France) politicians
French Senators of the Fifth Republic
Deputies of the 7th National Assembly of the French Fifth Republic
Deputies of the 8th National Assembly of the French Fifth Republic
Deputies of the 9th National Assembly of the French Fifth Republic
Deputies of the 10th National Assembly of the French Fifth Republic
Mayors of places in Île-de-France
Chevaliers of the Légion d'honneur